Main waterfalls of Turkey are listed below:

References 

Waterfalls
 
Turkey